Flight to Denmark is an album led pianist Duke Jordan recorded in 1973 and released on the Danish SteepleChase label.

Reception

In his review for AllMusic, Michael G. Nastos said "This is Duke Jordan at his most magnificent, with the ever-able Vinding and expert Thigpen playing their professional roles perfectly, producing perhaps the second best effort (next to Flight to Jordan from 13 years hence) from the famed bop pianist".

Track listing
All compositions by Duke Jordan except as indicated
 "No Problem" – 6:41
 "Here's That Rainy Day" (Jimmy Van Heusen, Johnny Burke) – 7:25
 "Everything Happens To Me" (Matt Dennis, Tom Adair) – 5:34
 "Glad I Met Pat" [Take 3] – 5:03 Bonus track on CD release
 "Glad I Met Pat" [Take 4] – 5:22
 "How Deep Is the Ocean?" (Irving Berlin) – 7:31
 "On Green Dolphin Street" (Bronisław Kaper, Ned Washington) – 8:15
 "If I Did - Would You?" [Take 1] – 3:41 Bonus track on CD release
 "If I Did - Would You?" [Take 2] – 3:50
 "Flight to Denmark" – 5:43
 "No Problem" – 7:09 Bonus track on CD release
 "Jordu" – 4:54 Bonus track on CD release

Personnel
Duke Jordan – piano
Mads Vinding – bass 
Ed Thigpen – drums

References

1974 albums
Duke Jordan albums
SteepleChase Records albums